Qaleh Sangi (also Romanized as Qal‘eh Sangī and Qal‘eh-ye Sangī) is a village in Kahrizak Rural District, Kahrizak District, Ray County, Tehran Province, Iran. At the 2006 census, its population was 758, in 191 families.

References 

Populated places in Ray County, Iran